Illinois Route 173 (IL 173) is a  east–west state highway that runs from Illinois Route 251 in the Rockford suburb of Machesney Park east to Illinois Route 137 (Sheridan Road/Buckley) in Zion near the Illinois-Wisconsin border.  Illinois Route 173 is also one of the northernmost east-west state highways in Illinois.   On Interstate 94 (Tri-State Tollway) traveling south from Wisconsin, it is the second road seen which has an interchange at that location.  Similarly, when traveling south/east from Wisconsin on Interstates 39/90 and U.S. Route 51 (Jane Addams Memorial Tollway), Illinois Route 173 is only the third exit into Illinois.  In 2008, the entirety of Illinois 173 has been designated the 173rd Airborne Brigade Highway

Route description 
Illinois 173 travels across relatively hilly northern Illinois from the Rockford area to Zion. This area is more densely populated than other portions of rural Illinois. It is two lanes for over 90% of its length.

In July 2007, a new interchange was constructed at Illinois 173, Interstates 39/90, and U.S. Route 51 (Jane Addams Memorial Tollway).

History 
SBI Route 173 originally ran from near downtown Rockford (along Forest Hills Road) to Zion. During the 1980s, when the village of Machesney Park was heavily developed and incorporated, Illinois Route 173 was scaled back and its western terminus moved to Illinois Route 251 (North 2nd Street). From 1972 to 1994 the highway also assumed a portion of what is now Illinois Route 137 north to the Wisconsin border.

Major intersections

References

External links

173
Transportation in Lake County, Illinois
Transportation in McHenry County, Illinois
Transportation in Boone County, Illinois
Transportation in Winnebago County, Illinois